One Year, One Night is a 2022 Spanish-French drama film directed by Isaki Lacuesta starring Nahuel Pérez Biscayart and Noémie Merlant. Inspired on the book  by Ramón González, it explores trauma in the aftermath of the Bataclan theatre massacre.

It premiered at the 72nd Berlin International Film Festival on 14 February 2022.

Plot 
Following Ramón and Céline, survivors of the Bataclan theatre massacre, the plot goes back and forth between the night of the attack at the Bataclan and the trauma experienced in the year thereafter.

Cast

Production 
Based on the book Paz, amor y death metal by Ramón González, the screenplay was penned by Fran Araújo, Isa Campo and Isaki Lacuesta.

Ramón Campos, Teresa Fernández-Valdés, Jérôme Vidal, Isaki Lacuesta, and Isa Campo took over production duties.

The score was composed by Refree. The film is a Mr Fields and Friends, Bambú Producciones, La Termita Films and Noodles Production production, with the participation of TVE, Movistar+, TVC, and support from ICAA,  and Eurimages. Filming began on 8 February 2021 in Barcelona. Shooting later moved to Paris.

Release 
The film premiered on 14 February 2022, screened at Berlinale Palast as part of the 72nd Berlin International Film Festival's main competition. BTeam Pictures distributed the film in Spain, where it was released on 21 October 2022.

Reception 
One Year, One Night received generally positive reviews from film critics. It holds a 75% approval rating on review aggregator website Rotten Tomatoes based on 12 reviews, with an average rating of 7.90/10.

Jonathan Holland of Screendaily considered the film to be "an emotionally compelling psychological drama", bringing some of Lacuesta's hallmarks, including a quasi-documentary style and a deep compassion for the unfortunate.

Anna Smith of Deadline deemed the film to remain "a powerful, bittersweet meditation on the impact of trauma and the desire not to be defined by it".

Top ten lists 
The film appeared on a number of critics' top ten lists of the best Spanish films of 2022:

Accolades 

|-
| rowspan = "22" align = "center" | 2023 
| rowspan = "14" | 15th Gaudí Awards || colspan = "2" | Best Non-Catalan Language Film ||  || rowspan = "14" | 
|-
| Best Director || Isaki Lacuesta || 
|-
| Best Actress || Noémie Merlant || 
|-
| Best Actor || Nahuel Pérez Biscayart || 
|-
| Best Supporting Actor || Enric Auquer || 
|-
| Best Adapted Screenplay || Isa Campo, Isaki Lacuesta, Fran Araujo || 
|-
| Best Production Supervision || Laia Coll || 
|-
| Best Art Direction || Laia Colet || 
|-
| Best Editing || Sergi Dies, Fernando Franco || 
|-
| Best Original Score || Raül Refree || 
|-
| Best Cinematography || Irina Lubtchansky || 
|-
| Best Sound || Amanda Villavieja, Eva Valiño, Alejandro Castillo, Marc Orts || 
|-
| Best Visual Effects || Laura Pedro || 
|-
| Best Makeup and Hairstyles || Alma Casal, Virginie Berland, Milou Sanner || 
|-
| rowspan = "4" | 10th Feroz Awards || colspan = "2" | Best Drama Film ||  || rowspan = "4" | 
|-
| Best Screenplay || Fran Araújo, Isa Campo, Isaki Lacuesta || 
|-
| Best Actor in a Film || Nahuel Pérez Biscayart || 
|-
| Best Soundtrack || Raül Refree || 
|-
| 78th CEC Medals || Best Adapted Screenplay || Isa Campo, Isaki Lacuesta, Fran Araújo ||  || align = "center" | 
|-
| rowspan = "3" | 37th Goya Awards || Best Adapted Screenplay || Fran Araújo, Isa Campo, Isaki Lacuesta ||  || rowspan = "3" | 
|-
| Best Editing || Fernando Franco, Sergi Díes || 
|-
| Best Sound || Amanda Villavieja, Eva Valiño, Marc Orts, Alejandro Castillo || 
|}

See also 
 List of Spanish films of 2022

References

External links
 

2022 drama films
2022 films
French drama films
Spanish drama films
Films set in Paris
Films shot in Paris
Films shot in Barcelona
November 2015 Paris attacks
2020s Spanish films
Bambú Producciones films
2020s French films